Krugloozyornoye is an urban-type settlement in the Oral City Administration, West Kazakhstan Region, Kazakhstan. Since 2013 it includes the nearby village of Serebryakovo (KATO code - 271039100). Population:

Geography
Krugloozyornoye is located by the west bank of the Ural river, south of where the Kushum branches off the Ural. It lies  SSW of Oral City.

References

Populated places in West Kazakhstan Region